The Social Animal is an APA-medal winning book about social psychology by Elliot Aronson. Originally published in 1972, The Social Animal is currently in its twelfth edition. In a style written for the general audience, the book covers what modern psychology knows about the reasons for some of the most important aspects of human behavior.

Contents
Aronson begins the book by citing a number of scenarios, real and constructed — reactions to the Kent State shootings, the Stanford prison experiments, and a four-year-old boy given a drum set among them — that illustrate a variety of human behaviors seen in real life. The rest of the book is spent primarily on explaining how human minds operate and interact with each other, using these situations as examples. The book covering topics include the causes of prejudice, aggression, and cognitive dissonance.

In explaining the reasons why people behave in unusual ways, Aronson cites his "first law":

People who do crazy things are not necessarily crazy.

Style and use of experimental method
As a scientist, Aronson leans on the importance of case work and experimental study. Thus, the Social Animal's explanations of human behavior are largely validated with citations of studies done by researchers of social psychology. Throughout the book, Aronson relies on the use of controlled experiments to validate empirical observation.

References

Elliot Aronson: The Social Animal, Palgrave Macmillan, 10th revised edition, 2007, 
Elliot Aronson (Ed.): Readings about the Social Animal, W.H. Freeman & Co, 10th edition, 2007,

External links
Elliot Aronson - Social Psychology Network

1972 non-fiction books
Books about social psychology
Sociology books